Potochnitsa is a village in Krumovgrad Municipality, Kardzhali Province, southern Bulgaria. The village is a Turkish-origin settlement and is referred to as Ada or Adaköy in local Turkish.

References

Villages in Kardzhali Province